Charaxes (Polyura) cognatus, the Sulawesi blue nawab, is a butterfly in the family Nymphalidae. It was described by Samuel Constantinus Snellen van Vollenhoven in 1861. It is endemic to Sulawesi.

Subspecies
 C. c. cognatus (Sulawesi)
 C. c. yumikoe Nishimura, 1984 (Banggai)
 C. c. bellona Tsukada, 1991 (South Sulawesi, Tukangbesi)

References

External links

 Polyura Billberg, 1820 at Markku Savela's Lepidoptera and Some Other Life Forms

Polyura
Butterflies described in 1861
Butterflies of Indonesia
Taxa named by Samuel Constantinus Snellen van Vollenhoven